John William Meagher (December 5, 1917 – April 14, 1996) was a United States Army soldier and a recipient of the United States military's highest decoration—the Medal of Honor—for his actions during the Battle of Okinawa in World War II.

Meagher joined the Army from his birthplace of Jersey City, New Jersey, and by June 19, 1945, was serving as a technical sergeant in Company E, 305th Infantry Regiment, 77th Infantry Division. On that day, near Ōzato, Okinawa, he prevented the tank he was riding on from being disabled by an enemy soldier and then single-handedly destroyed two enemy positions. For his actions, he was awarded the Medal of Honor one year later, on June 26, 1946.

Meagher left the Army while still a technical sergeant. He died at age 78 and was buried in Arlington National Cemetery. He is survived by his wife and two daughters.  His eldest son John W. Meagher died in 2008.

Medal of Honor citation

Technical Sergeant Meagher's official Medal of Honor citation reads as follows:
He displayed conspicuous gallantry and intrepidity above and beyond the call of duty. In the heat of the fight, he mounted an assault tank, and, with bullets splattering about him, designated targets to the gunner. Seeing an enemy soldier carrying an explosive charge dash for the tank treads, he shouted fire orders to the gunner, leaped from the tank, and bayoneted the charging soldier. Knocked unconscious and his rifle destroyed, he regained consciousness, secured a machinegun from the tank, and began a furious 1-man assault on the enemy. Firing from his hip, moving through vicious crossfire that ripped through his clothing, he charged the nearest pillbox, killing 6. Going on amid the hail of bullets and grenades, he dashed for a second enemy gun, running out of ammunition just as he reached the position. He grasped his empty gun by the barrel and in a violent onslaught killed the crew. By his fearless assaults T/Sgt. Meagher single-handedly broke the enemy resistance, enabling his platoon to take its objective and continue the advance.

See also

List of Medal of Honor recipients

References

1917 births
1996 deaths
United States Army personnel of World War II
United States Army Medal of Honor recipients
Burials at Arlington National Cemetery
People from Jersey City, New Jersey
United States Army soldiers
World War II recipients of the Medal of Honor